Nakarin Fuplook (born November 14, 1983) is a former Thai professional footballer who played as a centre-back.

References
National Team Players

1983 births
Living people
Nakarin Fuplook
Nakarin Fuplook
Nakarin Fuplook
Nakarin Fuplook
Nakarin Fuplook
Nakarin Fuplook
Nakarin Fuplook
Association football defenders